The Society for Popular Astronomy (SPA) is a national astronomical society based in the United Kingdom for beginners to amateur astronomy.

History and overview

It was founded in 1953 as the Junior Astronomical Society by experienced amateur astronomers including Patrick Moore, Ernest Noon and Eric Turner to encourage beginners to the science and to promote astronomy among the general public.

The term "Junior" was used to denote its role compared to the long-established society the British Astronomical Association. The name was changed in 1994 to make clear that the society was for beginners of all ages, and for those who wanted a less technical approach. In 2007 a new Young Stargazer category of membership was introduced to cater specifically for members aged under 16.

The society's first patron was Dr J G Porter whose BBC radio broadcasts about astronomy preceded television's long-running series The Sky At Night. Since his death, the role has been held by certain Astronomers Royal. The society's president, who serves a two-year term, is usually a senior professional astronomer.

The SPA aims to show that astronomy can be fun and to promote an interest in observing the sky among its members. The SPA has a number of observing sections whose work members can participate in. These cover observations of aurorae, comets, deep sky, the Moon, meteors, occultations, the planets, the Sun and variable stars.

The society publishes a magazine, Popular Astronomy, which from 2011 is being published every two months. Previously it was a quarterly publication, but it now includes material that was carried in now-defunct separate regular printed News Circulars. A members-only email newsletter provides immediate news of major discoveries as well as information and reminders about society meetings and events.

The SPA offers advisory services on choosing a telescope, electronic imaging, photography and the GCSE astronomy examination.

Meetings are held quarterly in London and there is an annual weekend course in Shropshire. Occasional meetings are held elsewhere including at planetariums.
  
NOTE DATED 2020 MAY: Meetings are being held on-line for the foreseeable future; the annual weekend course scheduled for 2020 November has been deferred twice to 2022.

NOTE DATED 2023 JANUARY: Physical meetings in London have resumed, with on-line streaming available for the benefit of those unable to travel to the venue. The annual weekend courses have also resumed.

Observing sections

See also
 List of astronomical societies

Notes

References

External links
SPA website
SPA discussion forums

1953 establishments in the United Kingdom
Amateur astronomy organizations
British astronomy organisations
Scientific organizations established in 1953
Astronomy societies